Udías is a municipality located in the autonomous community of Cantabria, Spain.

Localities

 Canales.
 Cobijón.
 La Hayuela.
 El Llano.
 Pumalverde (Capital)
 Rodezas.
 Toporias.
 Valoria.
 La Virgen.

References

Municipalities in Cantabria